Gediminas (shortened as Gedas) is a Lithuanian masculine given name. Notable people with the given name include:
Gediminas (ca. 1275–1341), Grand Duke of Lithuania from 1315 or 1316
Gediminas Akstinas (born 1961), Lithuanian painter
Gediminas Bagdonas (born 1985), Lithuanian road racing cyclist
Gediminas Baravykas (1940–1995), Lithuanian architect and painter 
Gediminas Gelgotas (born 1986), Lithuanian composer
Gediminas Kirkilas (born 30 1951), Lithuanian politician, former Prime Minister of Lithuania
Gediminas Maceina (born 1984), Lithuanian basketball player
Gediminas Marcišauskas (born 1982), Lithuanian rugby union player 
Gediminas Motuza (born 1946), Lithuanian geologist and author
Gediminas Paulauskas (born 1982), Lithuanian football defender
Gediminas Šerkšnys (born 1948), Lithuanian politician
Gediminas Vagnorius (born 1957), Lithuanian politician, former Prime Minister of Lithuania
Gediminas Valiuškis (born 1927), Lithuanian architect
Gediminas Vičius (born 1985), Lithuanian football midfielder
Gediminas Žiemelis (born 1977), Lithuanian businessman and business consultant

Lithuanian masculine given names